The discography of Emerson, Lake & Palmer, an English progressive rock band, includes 9 studio albums, 24 live albums, 12 compilation albums and 17 singles.

Albums

Studio albums

Live albums

Compilation albums

Singles

Notes
 1^ - "Jerusalem" was banned by the BBC, but charted in UK's Music Week Top 75.
 2^ - Hit #14 in South Africa, Nov 1977  
 A^ - released in France.
 B^ - A-side credited as 'Greg Lake'. 
 C^ - released in Italy. A-side credited as 'Keith Emerson'.
 D^ - In Germany, "Canario" was the A-side, "All I want is You" the B-side.
 E^ - released in US/Canada/JPN/NZ.
 F^ - new studio version 1993
 G^ - released in Germany.

Video albums

References

External links
 
Unofficial discography of Emerson, Lake & Palmer

Discographies of British artists
Rock music group discographies